Sun Rongmin (born 1951) is a Chinese diplomat. He was Ambassador of the People's Republic of China to Luxembourg (2002–2007), Poland (2007–2010) and Slovenia (2010–2012).

References

1951 births
Living people
Ambassadors of China to Luxembourg
Ambassadors of China to Poland
Ambassadors of China to Slovenia